Humphrey Senhouse may refer to:

 Humphrey Senhouse (port founder) (1705–1770), landowner and founder of the port of Maryport
 Humphrey Senhouse (politician) (1731–1814), British Tory politician and Member of Partiament for Cockermouth and Cumberland
 Humphrey Fleming Senhouse (1781–1841), British naval officer